This is a list of Royal Doulton Bunnykins figurines.  Doulton & Co. (Royal Doulton) introduced the Bunnykins figurines in 1939 with six original Bunnykins figurines designed by Charles Noke based on illustrations by Sister Mary Barbara Bailey.  Shortly thereafter, and prior to World War II, Doulton & Co. discontinued their manufacture.  After Royal Doulton purchased the Beswick Pottery factory in 1969, Royal Doulton reintroduced the Bunnykins figurines.  After the closure of Royal Doulton factory in England in 2005, Bunnykins figurines are produced in Asia.  The Bunnykins figurines are in ascending order and include the name of the figurine, designer/modeler, date introduced, and the date discontinued.

Original Bunnykins 1939

 D6001 - Billy Bunnykins 
 D6002 - Mary Bunnykins 
 D6003 - Farmer Bunnykins 
 D6004 - Mother Bunnykins 
 D6024 - Freddy Bunnykins 
 D6025 - Reggie Bunnykins

Figurines DB1 to DB99

Figurines DB100 to DB199

Figurines DB200 to DB299

Figurines DB300 to DB399

Figurines DB400 to DB516

See also

 Bunnykins
 Royal Doulton
 Beswick Pottery
 Mary Barbara Bailey

References

Citations

Sources
 Dale, Jean and Louise Irvine. Royal Doulton Collectables: A Charlton Standard Catalogue, Fourth Edition, Charlton Press, UK (2006) 
 Irvine, Louise. Royal Doulton Bunnykins: Collectors Book, Richard Dennis Publications, UK (1996) 
 Irvine, Louise. Royal Doulton Bunnykins Figures, UK International Ceramics (1996) 

British porcelain
Arts-related lists
Figurines